Per-Ola Quist (born 18 February 1961 in Malmö, Skåne County) is a former Swedish Olympic swimmer. He competed in the 1980 Summer Olympics, where he swum the 200 m freestyle and the 4×200 m freestyle relay.

Clubs
Helsingborgs SS

References
sports-reference

1961 births
Living people
Swimmers at the 1980 Summer Olympics
Olympic swimmers of Sweden
Sportspeople from Malmö
Swedish male freestyle swimmers
World Aquatics Championships medalists in swimming